Marchovelette is a village of Wallonia and a district of the municipality of Fernelmont, located in the province of Namur, Belgium.

It was formerly a municipality itself until the fusion of Belgian municipalities in 1977.

See also 
 Fort de Marchovelette

External links 
 
 Website of Fernelmont (French)

Former municipalities of Namur (province)